Phú Hội may refer to several places in Vietnam:

Phú Hội, Huế, a ward of Huế
Phú Hội, An Giang, a commune of An Phú District
Phú Hội, Đồng Nai, a commune of Nhơn Trạch District
Phú Hội, Lâm Đồng, a commune of Đức Trọng District